The House Where Evil Dwells is a 1982 American-Japanese horror film starring Edward Albert, Susan George and Doug McClure about an American family that moves into a reputed haunted house in the hills of Japan. It was directed by Kevin Connor and produced by Martin B. Cohen. It was based on a novel by James Hardiman and turned into a screenplay by Robert Suhosky.

Plot
In 1840, in the rural and wooded hillside region of Kushiata near Kyoto, Japan, a samurai, named Shigero, comes home to find his wife, Otami, in bed with another man, named Masanori. In a violent scene, Shigero kills them both and then himself. Flash-forward to the present day, an American family of three, which includes writer Ted Fletcher, his wife Laura, and their 12-year-old daughter, Amy, moves into this since-abandoned house and starts to experience incidents of haunting and possession. The three dead people still haunt the house and subject each of the Fletcher family to various harassment and mischief which gets more frequent and serious with each passing day.

A Zen monk approaches Ted and tells him the story about the murders and urges him to leave the house. At the same time, Laura slowly becomes consumed by the evil presence of the three ghosts and begins an affair with Alex Curtis, a diplomat friend of Ted's who introduced them to the house. The evil presence within the haunted house, including the ghosts briefly possessing each member of the family to do odd things, reveals that the ghosts are plotting to re-enact the mass murder-suicide so their souls could be free from the confines of the house.

The supernatural incidents becomes more frequent when Ted is nearly drowned in a lake by Otami's ghost, and the ghosts of Shigero and Masanori take the form of giant spider crabs which attack Amy one evening and it leads her to falling from a tree when she tries to escape and is forced to be sent back to America.

At the climax, Ted calls the Zen monk, who exorcises the ghosts from the house and tells them to leave by the morning, before ghosts will return. When Laura tells Ted about her infidelity with Alex, he takes it very badly and attacks her. Alex arrives at the house, whereupon the ghosts also return to the house. They possess all three of them and finally re-enact the gory confrontation from the opening scene, leading to the deaths of Alex, Laura, and Ted. The movie ends with the three ghosts leaving the house for the afterlife, and implying that the souls of Ted, Laura and Alex now haunt the cursed house in their place.

Cast
Edward Albert as Ted Fletcher 
Susan George as Laura Fletcher
Doug McClure as Alex Curtis
Amy Barrett as Amy Fletcher
Mako Hattori as Otami
Tsuiyuki Sasaki as Shigero (as Toshiyuki Sasaki)
Toshiya Maruyama as Masanori
Tsuyako Olajima as Majyo Witch (as Tsuyako Okajima)
Henry Mittwer as Zen Monk
Mayumi Umeda as Noriko, the babysitter
Shuren Sakurai as Noh Mask Maker
Hiroko Takano as Wakako
Shôji Ohara as Assistant Mask Maker (as Shoji Ohara)
Jirô Shirai as Tadashi (as Jiro Shirai)
Kazuo Yoshida as Editor
Kunihiko Shinjo as Assistant Editor
Gentaro Mori as Yoshio
Tomoko Shimizu as Aiko
Misao Arai as Hayashi
Chiyoko Hardiman as Mama-San
Hideo Shimedo as Policeman (as Hideo Shimado)

Critical reception

The film drew mixed reviews.  Vincent Canby of The New York Times wrote, "The House Where Evil Dwells... should satisfy all but the most insatiable appetites for haunted-house movies..."

TV Guide said, "The film has more nudity than chills, but it does have some quirky humor, especially in the exorcism scene."

See also
List of ghost films

References

External links

1982 horror films
1982 films
Films set in Kyoto
Metro-Goldwyn-Mayer films
United Artists films
American ghost films
American supernatural horror films
Japanese ghost films
Japanese horror films
Toei Company films
Films based on novels
Films directed by Kevin Connor
Japan in non-Japanese culture
Films scored by Ken Thorne
English-language Japanese films
1980s English-language films
1980s American films
1980s Japanese films